Charles Gold may refer to:

Charles Gold (British Army officer) (d. 1842), British artillery officer, fought at Waterloo for 2nd Infantry Division (United Kingdom)
Charles Emilius Gold (1809–1871), New Zealand soldier and artist, son of the above
Sir Charles Gold (MP) (1837–1923), Liberal Member of Parliament for Saffron Walden